The 1980 Tour de France was the 67th edition of Tour de France, one of cycling's Grand Tours. The Tour began in Frankfurt on 26 June and finished on the Champs-Élysées in Paris on 20 July. The Tour started with 13 teams, with 10 cyclists each.

Start list

By team

By rider

By nationality
The 130 riders that competed in the 1980 Tour de France represented 11 different countries. Riders from four countries won stages during the race; Dutch riders won the largest number of stages.

Notes

References

1980 Tour de France
1980